Peter Bischoff (24 March 1904 – 1 July 1976) was a German competitive sailor and Olympic champion. He won a gold medal in the Star class at the 1936 Summer Olympics in Berlin, together with Hans-Joachim Weise. In 1937 he married the German soprano Carla Spletter.

References

External links
 
 
 

1904 births
1976 deaths
Sportspeople from Hamburg
German male sailors (sport)
Sailors at the 1936 Summer Olympics – Star
Olympic sailors of Germany
Olympic gold medalists for Germany
Olympic medalists in sailing
Medalists at the 1936 Summer Olympics